Rhinocoeta hauseri is a species of beetle in the subfamily Cetoniinae (flower chafers). They are an afrotropical species recorded to exist in Tanzania and Mozambique.

References

Cetoniinae
Beetles described in 1860